Linslade was an urban district in the administrative county of Buckinghamshire, England from 1897 to 1965.

Origins
When parish and district councils were established in December 1894 under the Local Government Act 1894, the parish of Linslade was included in the Linslade Rural District, created from the parts of the Leighton Buzzard Rural Sanitary District and Berkhamsted Rural Sanitary District which were in Buckinghamshire. Shortly after the new districts were established, the process began for making the parish of Linslade its own urban district, which came into effect on 1 October 1897. With Linslade being removed from the rural district which bore its name, the Linslade Rural District was renamed at the same time, becoming instead Wing Rural District.

The short-lived Linslade Parish Council was therefore replaced by Linslade Urban District Council, which held its first meeting on 2 October 1897. Henry Finch was appointed the first chairman of the council, having previously been the chairman of the parish council.

Premises
Until 1899 the Linslade Urban District Council met at the Stoke Road Board School, as the parish council had done. In 1899 the council rented some rooms at a house called "Gartlet" at 14 Leighton Road to act as their offices and meeting place. The rest of the building was the home and offices of the council's clerk, Robert John Platten.

In 1912 the council moved its offices and meeting place a few doors down the street to 6 Leighton Road, which had previously been an architect's office. In 1929 the building at 6 Leighton Road was extended so that it could also serve as the headquarters of Eaton Bray Rural District and Wing Rural District. Eaton Bray Rural District Council was abolished in 1933, and Wing Rural District Council moved next door to 8 Leighton Road in 1951. Linslade Urban District Council remained based at 6 Leighton Road until its abolition in 1965.

Abolition
As part of a county boundary change in 1965 the parish and urban district of Linslade was abolished, merging with Leighton Buzzard Urban District in Bedfordshire to form a parish and urban district called Leighton-Linslade, which was placed in Bedfordshire. A small portion (19 acres) of the former Linslade parish was transferred to the parish of Soulbury in Wing Rural District, and so stayed in Buckinghamshire.

References

History of Buckinghamshire
Local government in Buckinghamshire
Urban districts of England